Manuel Guijarro Arenas (born 7 July 1998) is a Spanish sprinter specialising in the 400 metres. He was part of the relay that holds the national record in the 4 x 400 m indoor.

International competitions

References

External links
 

1998 births
Living people
Spanish male sprinters
Sportspeople from Albacete